Macha is the name of a goddess and several other characters in Irish mythology.

Macha may also refer to:

Places
Macha crater, a group of meteorite craters in the Sakha Republic, Russia
Macha, Russia, several rural localities in Russia
Macha, Zambia, a region and chiefdom in the Southern Province of Zambia
Lake Mácha, artificial fish pond in the Czech Republic

People
Macha (surname)
Macha Oromo, a division or sub-group of the Oromo people

Given name
Macha Grenon (born 1968), Canadian actress
Macha Méril (born 1940), French actress and writer
Macha Rosenthal (1917–1996), American poet and editor
Macha van der Vaart (born 1972), retired Dutch hockey player
M. Macha Nightmare, American Neopagan witch

Fictional characters
Macha, a playable character in Chrono Cross
Macha, alternative name of Mia, a character in the anime .hack//SIGN

Other uses
LÉ Macha (01), a ship in the Irish Naval Service, named for the goddess
Macha (band), defunct American experimental post-rock band from Georgia
Macha Mission, a Christian mission in Zambia
Mid-American Collegiate Hockey Association (MACHA), an American Collegiate Hockey Association Division 2 conference not sanctioned by the NCAA
Mesodesma donacium, a Chilean native clam colloquially known as a macha, used for example in the dish Machas a la parmesana
Ensis macha, an edible razor clam from South America, mainly fished in Chile, and known colloquially as navaja or navajuela
"Macha Macha Re", a song in the 2022 Bollywood movie Dasvi

See also

Matcha, powdered green tea used for example in the Japanese tea ceremony
Flag of Macha, the remains of the first physical flag of Argentina
Santiago de Macha, a town in Potosí Department, Bolivia